Zachtronics LLC is an American indie video game studio, best known for their engineering puzzle games and programming games. Zachtronics was founded by Zach Barth in 2000, who serves as its lead designer. Some of their products include SpaceChem, Infinifactory, TIS-100, and Shenzhen I/O.

History 

Zachtronics was founded by American video game designer and programmer Zach Barth in 2000. Barth started creating games early in life and further developed his programming skills at Rensselaer Polytechnic Institute (RPI), where he joined the game development club. Barth studied computer systems engineering and computer science at RPI. He was one of three students leading the interdisciplinary team of the CapAbility Games Research Project, a collaboration of RPI with the Center for Disability Services in Albany, New York. In 2008, the team produced Capable Shopper, a shopping simulation game for players with various degrees of disability.

Barth's initial games were generally free browser games offered on his website. One of these was Infiniminer, the block-building game that he claims influenced Minecraft by Mojang. His earlier, non-commercial, games included twenty that were published on his old website and "five good ones" which he transferred over to the new site. Four of these use Adobe Flash to make them cross-platform, in spite of Flash's development environment. The other one is based on .NET Framework for greater programming convenience. SpaceChem also used .NET, as Barth considers C# to be his favorite programming language. For marketing reasons, Barth decided against Microsoft XNA with its capability to cross-publish to Xbox 360, and switched to OpenGL, which allowed him to target the three operating systems required for inclusion in the Humble Indie Bundle.

After completing The Codex of Alchemical Engineering and getting positive feedback from it, Barth came up with the idea of making commercial games. The first of these was SpaceChem, which he developed the Zachtronics label for. It was also the first game where he took in a number of collaborators to help. SpaceChem was critically praised, which led Barth to continue to develop more games under the Zachtronics label. A few ideas failed to come to light, and with expectations for the studio to make another game, he opted to make Ironclad Tactics, which was more a real-time based card game rather than a puzzle game. Ironclad Tactics did not do as well as SpaceChem, and Barth realized there was more a market for the puzzle games that he had previously developed, and turned back to his Flash-based games. Initially he looked to take The Codex of Alchemical Engineering to make it a full commercial release, but instead ended up producing Infinifactory and later TIS-100.

In 2015, Barth joined Valve to work on SteamVR. He worked there for 10 months before departing. Near the time he started to work at Valve, Barth had been considering shutting down Zachtronics due to stress of running the business alongside the new responsibilities at Valve. Sometime between the release of TIS-100 and Shenzhen I/O, Barth had come into contact with Alliance Media Holdings who offered to buy the studio and to manage the publishing of the games, while allowing Barth to retain his creative lead and control. Since the studio's acquisition, it has published Shenzhen I/O, Opus Magnum, and Exapunks.

In June 2019, the studio published the book Zach-Like that includes design documents and other reference material used by Barth and his team during the development of his games. Zachtronics used Kickstarter to produce physical copies of the book by early 2019, and by June 2019 released the title as a free eBook on Steam along with a bundle of Barth's older titles. The studio launched Zachademics in June 2019, a program to allow educational and non-profit institutions to freely download and use several of his games for educational purposes.

With the release of Last Call BBS planned in July 2022, Zachtronics announced that that would likely be the last game they develop, as they "felt it was time for a change." Barth also said the decision was motivated by the fact that Zachtronics was only making games of a similar puzzle nature, keeping them "locked into doing something we didn’t feel like doing forever," whereas moving on would allow him and other members of the team to work on other types of games.

Games developed 
Zachtronics' games have generally been focused around engineering puzzle games, designing machines or the equivalent to take input and make output; these are generally part of the broader class of programming games. These games, including SpaceChem, Infinifactory, and Opus Magnum, feature multiple puzzles that are open ended in solution; as long as the player can make the required output, the game considers that puzzle solved and allows the player to access the next puzzle. Atop their solution, the player is shown statistics related to their solution which relate to some efficiency - how fast their solution completed the puzzle, how few parts they used, and the like. These stats are given with histograms from other players, including their friends via the game's storefront, that have also completed that puzzle. This gives a type of competitiveness to the game for players to find ways to optimize their solutions and improve their relative scores. Newer games also feature support for user-created puzzles.

Infiniminer 
Infiniminer is an open source multi-player block-based sandbox building and digging game, in which the player plays as a miner searching for minerals by carving tunnels through procedurally generated maps and building structures. According to the author Barth, it was based on the earlier games Infinifrag, Team Fortress, and Motherload by XGen Studios.

Barth wrote Infiniminer in his spare time, with the help of a friend, and released it in steps of incremental updates during April–May 2009. It quickly garnered a following on message boards around the Internet.

Infiniminer was originally intended to be played as a team-based competitive game, where the goal is to locate and excavate precious metals, and bring the findings to the surface to earn points for the player's team. However, as the game gained popularity, players gravitated towards the emergent gameplay functionality of building in-world objects, instead of the stated design goal of competition.

Zachtronics discontinued development of the game less than a month after its first release as the result of its source code leak. As Barth had not obfuscated the C# .NET source code of the game, it was decompiled and extracted from the binaries. Hackers modified the code to make mods, but also started making clients that would target vulnerabilities in the game as well as build incompatible game forks that fragmented its user base. Barth, who was making the game for free, then lost interest and dropped the project, as development of the game had become too difficult. The source code of Infiniminer is now available under the MIT License. Building Infiniminer requires Visual Studio 2008 and XNA Game Studio 3.0.

Infiniminer is the game that initially inspired Minecraft (and subsequently FortressCraft, CraftWorld and Ace of Spades). The visuals and mechanics of procedural generation and terrain deformation of Minecraft were drawn from Infiniminer. According to Minecraft developer Markus Persson, after he discovered Infiniminer, he "decided it was the game he wanted to do".

SpaceChem 
Zachtronics is also known for its puzzle game SpaceChem in which the player creates chemical pathways similar in style to visual programming.

SpaceChem has garnered praise with the gaming community and is currently one of three games on the recommendation page of Team Fortress creator Robin Walker (the others being Hotline Miami and FTL: Faster Than Light), with him declaring it as "Pretty much the greatest game ever made".

In March 2011, Barth stated the possibility of making expansion packs to SpaceChem and adding a free update and editor which would allow users to create their own levels which could then be shared to other users, with the best ones being picked out by Zachtronics to be published and these were released on April 29 as the Shareholders' Update. Barth hinted at the prospect of a sequel and also stated that it would be fantastic to have SpaceChem on a future Humble Bundle. The game was included in the Humble Frozen Synapse Bundle charitable sale in early October 2011. The following year SpaceChem was the featured game on IndieGameStand, a site which features indie games with a pay-what-you-want model with a portion of the proceeds going to charity. Barth chose the Against Malaria Foundation as the charity to which 10% of the proceeds were donated.

Other games 
 Ironclad Tactics
 Infinifactory
 TIS-100
 Shenzhen I/O
 Opus Magnum
 Exapunks
 Eliza
 MOLEK-SYNTEZ
 Möbius Front '83
 Nerts! Online
 Ruckingenur II
 Last Call BBS
 The Zachtronics Solitaire Collection

References

External links 

American companies established in 2000
Indie video game developers
Video game companies of the United States
Video game companies established in 2000
Companies based in Redmond, Washington
2000 establishments in Washington (state)